HR24 or HR 24 may refer to:

HR 24, the star Kappa Sculptoris
HR-24 Sirsa, a Regional Transport Office district in India
HR24, a DirecTV HD-DVR Receiver model
2001 HR24, a main-belt asteroid officially named 51599 Brittany and discovered on April 28, 2001
New Hampshire House Resolution 24 (2008), a resolution for the impeachment of George W. Bush
HR24, Harwich Runners 24 Hour Race

See also
HR (disambiguation)
24 (disambiguation)